Corn sugar may refer to:
Glucose (dextrose monohydrate) produced from corn starch
The name for high-fructose corn syrup proposed by the Corn Refiners Association, and ultimately rejected by the FDA.